A statue of Thomas Starr King by Daniel Chester French is installed in San Francisco's Golden Gate Park, in the U.S. state of California.

The statue is made of bronze and has a granite base.

Inscription 
The following inscription is on the front of the statue:

See also
 Statue of Thomas Starr King (Sacramento, California)

References 

Golden Gate Park
Monuments and memorials in California
Outdoor sculptures in San Francisco
Sculptures by Daniel Chester French
Statues in San Francisco